Lieutenant General Thomas Fowke, also spelt Foulks, circa 1690 to 29 March 1765, was a British military officer from South Staffordshire, who was Governor of Gibraltar from 1753 to 1756, and twice court-martialled during his service. The first followed defeat at Prestonpans in the 1745 Jacobite Rising, when he was acquitted. As Governor, he was tried again for his part in the 1756 Battle of Minorca, a defeat that led to the execution of Admiral Byng.

Despite limited responsibility for the defeat, Fowke was originally sentenced to nine months suspension, but George II insisted he be dismissed from the army. He was reinstated as Lieutenant General following the accession of George III in 1761 and died in Bath in March 1765.

Fowke's great-uncle emigrated to Virginia in 1651, and was closely related to George Mason, 1725 to 1792, one of the Founding Fathers of the United States. Mason built Gunston Hall, named after the family home in Gunstone, South Staffordshire; it is now an historic monument.

Personal details
Thomas Fowke was the elder son of Thomas Fowke (ca 1645–1708) of Gunstone, South Staffordshire and his second wife Mary (ca 1650–1705). He had two sisters, Mary and Martha and his younger brother was Rear-admiral Edmund Thorpe Fowke (1704–1784).

He married twice, first to Elizabeth Ingoldsby (ca 1705–1735), with whom he had a daughter, Theophila Lucy (1724–1734). In 1747, he married Dorothea Randall (ca 1732–1788); they had two children, another Theophila (ca 1745–1756), and Sir Thomas Fowke (1744–1786). His grandson was Sir Frederick Fowke (1782–1856).

Career

Fowke began his military career during the War of the Spanish Succession in 1702 as an Ensign in Nicholas Lepell's Regiment of Foot, his father being a captain in the same unit. Until the late 19th century, commissions could be purchased or sold; in June 1707, he became captain after exchanging positions with his father, who died in June 1708. 

Peregrine Lascelles, who later served with Fowke in the 1745 Rising, was a captain in the same regiment. In 1710, the unit served in Spain, a last effort to win the Spanish throne for Archduke Charles of Austria. Despite victories at Almanara and Saragossa, the Allies were defeated at Villaviciosa in December. The regiment suffered heavy losses; Lepell, by then the senior British officer in Catalonia, reported losses of 107 men after the battle.

Villaviciosa ended the campaign in Spain, and Lepells was disbanded in November 1712 as the army was reduced prior to the 1713 Peace of Utrecht. Fowke managed to retain his commission, transferring into Whetham's, later 27th Foot, before joining Cotton's Foot, later Somerset Light Infantry in 1716, as a Major. In June 1722, he was commissioned as Lieutenant-Colonel Kerr's Dragoons, later 11th Hussars, a position he retained until late 1740. 

The period of comparative peace after 1713 ended with the outbreak of the War of the Austrian Succession, and in January 1741, Fowke became Colonel of a new regiment, the 43rd Foot. He exchanged into the Queen's Royal Regiment, then based in Scotland, and promoted Brigadier General in June 1745, three months before the Jacobite rising of 1745. As deputy to Sir John Cope, military commander in Scotland, he fought at Prestonpans in September; their army collapsed in the face of the Jacobite assault, in a battle lasting less than 15 minutes. Fowke commanded two regiments of dragoons, who fled without firing a shot, and halted only when they reached Berwick-upon-Tweed. He, Cope and Lascelles were later tried by a court-martial in 1746; while all three were exonerated, Cope never held command again. 

Fowke was posted to Flanders and became a Major General in 1747, shortly before the 1748 Treaty of Aix-la-Chapelle followed by an appointment as Governor of Gibraltar in 1752. The opening action of the Seven Years' War was the British naval defeat at Minorca in June 1756, an event that led to the trial and execution of Admiral John_Byng. Fowke was court martialled for allegedly refusing to provide Byng with soldiers from the Gibraltar garrison; originally suspended for nine months, George II insisted he be dismissed from the army. Contemporaries felt he and Byng had been unfairly singled out for a defeat brought about by general neglect. A 1757 Parliamentary committee noted the poor state of the island's defences, with crumbling walls and rotten gun platforms; over 35 senior officers were absent from their posts, including the governor and colonels of all four regiments in its garrison.

This ended Fowke's career, although George III reinstated his rank in 1761. Fowke died in Bath, Somerset in March 1765.

Legacy

In 1651, Thomas Fowke's great-uncle Gerard moved to Virginia, along with his cousin, Philip Mason; one of their descendants was George Mason (1725–1792), a US Founding Father. In 1755, he commemorated his family roots by building a new house in Virginia named Gunston Hall; in 1923, another Mason built a second Gunston Hall, in North Carolina.

Fowke kept a personal journal and record of correspondence; his papers for the period 1752 to 1755, including his time as Governor of Gibraltar, were acquired by in 2015 by the Lewis Walpole Library, part of Yale University.

After his retirement, he lived near Park Hill, Yorkshire, now the site of the Park Hill estate, Sheffield, which was given listed building status in 1998.

References

Sources
 
 
 
 
 
 
 
 
 
 
 
 
 
 

1690 births
1765 deaths
Governors of Gibraltar
British Army lieutenant generals
British Army personnel of the War of the Spanish Succession
British Army personnel of the Jacobite rising of 1745
British Army personnel of the War of the Austrian Succession
Somerset Light Infantry officers
27th Regiment of Foot officers
Queen's Royal Regiment officers
43rd Regiment of Foot officers
West Yorkshire Regiment officers
11th Hussars officers
People from South Staffordshire District
Military personnel from Staffordshire
British Army personnel who were court-martialled